The Paços do Concelho is a public building in the city centre of Mindelo, São Vicente, Cape Verde. Built between 1860 and 1873, it houses the administration of the municipality of São Vicente.

See also
List of buildings and structures in São Vicente, Cape Verde

References

Buildings and structures in Mindelo
Portuguese colonial architecture in Cape Verde